Pedrajas de San Esteban is a municipality located in the province of Valladolid, Castile and León, Spain. According to the 2004 census (INE), the municipality has a population of 3,317 inhabitants.

Twin towns
Pedrajas de San Esteban is twinned with:

  Saint-Nolff, France, since 1991
  Mola di Bari, Italy, since 2012

See also
Cuisine of the province of Valladolid

References

Municipalities in the Province of Valladolid